The pelagic goby (Sufflogobius bibarbatus), also known as the bearded goby , is a species of true goby from the family Gobiidae, native to the southeastern Atlantic Ocean.  It is currently the only known member of its genus.

Description
It has 7 dorsal spines and 12-13 dorsal soft rays. It has a single anal spine and 12-13 anal soft rays. Its fins are dusky to black in color.

Range and habitat

The bearded goby is usually found offshore but was also recorded in shore pools. Juveniles are epipelagic, while adults migrate to deeper waters, and large adults are only recorded from demersal trawls.

The gobies can stay on the ocean floor for at least 10 to 12 hours at a time in an area of de-oxygenated "toxic sludge" rich in hydrogen sulfide  where hardly anything lives except bacteria and nematodes. When settled on the bottom, they remain alert, showing rapid escape responses. They use the toxic mud as a refuge. Their population is growing despite the fact that they are now the main prey species in this unusual ecosystem.

Feeding
In 2010 was observed to feed on a species of jellyfish which was understood to be its main predator. Jellies provide up to 1/3 of the fish's diet. It hides from mackerel amongst the jellies' stinger-covered tentacles when it rises from the seafloor for nighttime feeding.

Predation
Fishes, penguins, Cape cormorants, crested terns and fur seals and jellies eat this fish.

This goby hides from predators within jelly tentacles when it rises to feed and reoxygenate its blood.

Although targeted by purse seines, it may also be caught incidentally in trawls.

References

Miller, P.J. 1990

Fish of South Africa
Gobiinae
Fish described in 1923